Menippe is a genus of true crabs. One of the best known species is the Florida stone crab. Most of the species of this genus are found in the Atlantic Ocean.

References

Eriphioidea
Taxa named by Wilhem de Haan
Decapod genera